Jerry Kazarian is a retired Armenian-American soccer forward who spent two seasons in the North American Soccer League.

Kazarian played for the Greater Los Angeles Soccer Club when he signed with the Los Angeles Aztecs of the North American Soccer League.  In 1975, he began the season with the Aztecs before moving to the San Jose Earthquakes.  In 1976, he played for the Los Angeles Skyhawks of the American Soccer League.

References

External links
 NASL stats
 NASL: Jerry Kazarian

1954 births
Footballers from Yerevan
American Soccer League (1933–1983) players
American soccer players
North American Soccer League (1968–1984) players
North American Soccer League (1968–1984) indoor players
Living people
Los Angeles Aztecs players
Los Angeles Skyhawks players
San Jose Earthquakes (1974–1988) players
Soviet emigrants to the United States
Soccer players from Los Angeles
Association football forwards